Nakayama-dera (中山寺 Nakayama-dera)  is a Buddhist temple, in Takarazuka, Hyōgo, Japan.

The Kansai Kannon Pilgrimage No.24.

History

The engi, or the official history of the temple, recorded that the temple was founded by Prince Shotoku, in the 6th century. It is one of the most popular temples in the region. Today's buildings of this temple were mainly built by Toyotomi Hideyori in the 17th century. Hideyori was a son of Toyotomi Hideyoshi who unified Japan in the 16th century.

Objects of worship

The principal object of worship at this temple is a Jūichimen Kannon, or the Goddess of Mercy with eleven heads. It is believed the Kannon has her power to give babies and its easy delivery.

Access

The entrance stations to this temple are Nakayama-kannon Station on the Hankyu Railway Takarazuka Line and Nakayamadera Station on the JR West Fukuchiyama Line (JR Takarazuka Line).

See also
Historical Sites of Prince Shōtoku

External links 
 Nakayama-dera
 kinki36fudo

Buddhist temples in Hyōgo Prefecture